Chixi Subdistrict is a subdistrict in Lanxi, Zhejiang, China. , it administers Shilongtou Residential Community and the following eleven villages: 
Wangtiedian Village
Changmantang Village
Liutang Village
Hougong Village
Zhuli Village
Shilongtou Village
Yangtang Village
Shanbeigang Village
Jinqiao Village
Shangxiatang Village
Limin Village

See also 
 List of township-level divisions of Zhejiang

References 

Township-level divisions of Zhejiang
Lanxi, Zhejiang